John Patrick Farrelly (March 15, 1856 – February 12, 1921) was an American prelate of the Roman Catholic Church. He served as bishop of the Diocese of Cleveland in Ohio from 1909 until his death in 1921.

Biography

Early life 
John Farrelly was born on March 15, 1856, in Memphis, Tennessee to John and Martha (née Clay) Farrelly. His father was a member of the Tennessee General Assembly, and his grandfather was one of the authors of the original Arkansas Constitution.

He and his parents moved to Little Rock, Arkansas, and later to Kentucky (1868), where the younger Farrelly attended St. Mary's College. After studying at Georgetown University in Washington, D.C., he entered Notre-Dame de la Paix University at Namur, Belgium, in 1873. He completed his studies at the Pontifical North American College in Rome, obtaining a Doctor of Sacred Theology degree.

Priesthood 
Farrelly was ordained to the priesthood for the Diocese of Nashville in Rome by Cardinal Raffaele La Valletta on May 22, 1880. After touring Egypt and Palestine, Farrelly returned to Tennessee in 1882

Back in Nashville, Farrelly was appointed a curate at the Cathedral of the Incarnation; he was later named as its pastor He was named chancellor of the diocese in 1883. Farrelly returned to Rome in 1887, becoming secretary of the American bishops there in September 1887. While in Rome, he served as spiritual director of the North American College from 1893 until 1909.

Bishop of Cleveland 
On March 18, 1909, Farrelly was appointed the fourth bishop of Cleveland by Pope Pius X. He received his episcopal consecration in Rome on May 1, 1909, from Cardinal Girolamo Gotti, with Bishops John Morris and Thomas Kennedy serving as co-consecrators. He was installed at St. John's Cathedral in Cleveland on June 13, 1909. 

During his 12-year-long tenure as bishop, Farrelly improved the parochial school system; organized Catholic Charities; and erected 47 churches and schools, including Cathedral Latin High School in Chardon, Ohio. During World War I, he was appointed by Cleveland Mayor Harry L. Davis to the Cleveland War Commission. Farrelly also ordered English to be spoken at all German churches and schools in the diocese.

Death and legacy 
John Farrelly died on February 12, 1921, from pneumonia in Knoxville, Tennessee, at age 64. He is buried in the crypt beneath the main altar of St. John's Cathedral in Cleveland.

References

1856 births
1921 deaths
St. Mary's College (Kentucky) alumni
Université de Namur alumni
Georgetown University alumni
People from Memphis, Tennessee
Roman Catholic bishops of Cleveland
20th-century Roman Catholic bishops in the United States
Catholics from Tennessee